Paracrossochilus acerus is a species of cyprinid in the genus Paracrossochilus. It is found in large schools, and is considered harmless to humans.

References

Cyprinid fish of Asia
Fish of Malaysia
Labeoninae